Seeing Things is a Canadian comedy-drama mystery television series with a fantasy twist, in that the lead character has postcognitive visions that help solve each episode's mystery. The series originally aired on CBC Television from 1981 to 1987. It was also seen in Europe, South Africa, Singapore, Spain, Australia and the United States. In all, 43 episodes were produced. With the exception of "Seeing R.E.D." (90 minutes) episodes were one hour long.

Series star Louis Del Grande (formerly an actor, writer, and co-producer of the hit sitcom The King of Kensington) was also the show's co-creator, with writer David Barlow.  Del Grande and Barlow wrote the first three episodes, and thereafter oversaw the writing staff and produced all 43 episodes.

Cast and premise
Louis Del Grande stars as Louis Ciccone, a balding, overweight 40-ish newspaper journalist for the Toronto Gazette.  Although the manic, motormouthed Louis is generally friendly, in pursuing his stories he's often pushy and self-centered, and is usually somewhat disorganized.  However, Lou is tenacious and dedicated, and he also has limited postcognitive abilities, which help him to solve murders (and get the resultant headline scoops).  Louis can only control his postcognitive abilities by investigating clues given to him in a vision ... only when he discovers new information will further visions occur, which provide increasingly more detail until they finally reveal the murderer.  At the start of the series, Louis' frequently rocky personal life is at a definite ebb—he's recently separated from his wife, and is living in a storeroom above his parents' bakery.  But as career-focused as Louis is, he's equally tenacious about getting back together with his semi-estranged wife and his pre-teen son, and he works hard to stay in their lives.
Martha Gibson (Del Grande's real-life wife) co-stars as Ciccone's ex-wife Marge, who, even though she and Louie are separated, reluctantly continues to help him with his cases. Marge even drives Louie around town (Louie, like Del Grande in real life, was too hyper to get a driver's license), though she initially rejected Louie's desire to rekindle their relationship.  Marge clearly still loves Lou, but is continually frustrated by Louie's focus on his job, which gives him an unpredictable schedule and takes him away from family life for long stretches.  However, they finally became a couple again in the show's final season. Del Grande and Gibson were married, then divorced in real life; they had re-wed just before the series started.
Janet-Laine Green plays assistant crown attorney Heather Redfern.  A young, competent prosecuting attorney from an upper-class background, Redfern is one of the very few people who know about Louie's postcognitive abilities, which often relate to cases she's working on.  Though she generally respects Louie's visions, she's often exasperated by their vague or inconclusive nature.  She's even more frustrated by Louie's tendency to, unannounced and uninvited, interrupt Redfern directly in the middle of client meetings, trials, social events, dates, or even in the middle of the night, to share his latest visions and/or theories with her.  Louie's frequent meetings with the gorgeous young lawyer also contribute to feelings of jealousy in Marge, although Louie and Redfern are never more than close working colleagues.  In fact, Louie invariably refers to her as "Redfern", and Redfern always addresses Louie as "Mr. Ciccone".

Other Ciccone family members
Al Bernardo plays Alberto Ciccone, Louis' father.  Generally cheerful, he encourages Louis to get back together with Marge.  He runs a small local bakery, with his wife.
Lynne Gordon plays Anna Ciccone, Louis' mother.  She tends to be a little less forgiving of Louis' foibles, and is definitely embarrassed by him having to move back in with his parents in his late thirties.
Ivan Beaulieu as Jason Ciccone, the son of Louis and Marge.  A pre-teen at the series' start, Jason is an upbeat, fairly well-adjusted kid, despite his odd family circumstances.  He lives with Marge, but sees Louie quite frequently.

Louie's workmates
Murray Westgate plays Max Perkins, Louie's demanding, impatient editor at the Gazette. 
Louis Negin plays Marlon Bede, the Gazette's food writer. Louie often mooches meals that Marlon's preparing (or creating recipes for) in his specially-built on-site Test Kitchen.

Other regulars
Ratch Wallace as Kenny Volker, Redfern's most frequent dating partner through the series.  Volker, a professional hockey player for the Toronto Maple Leafs, is tall, muscular, wealthy and generally polite ... although on the ice, he's paid to be a no-holds-barred goon.  
Cec Linder as Crown Attorney Robert T. Spenser, Redfern's boss.  Much more conservative than Redfern, Spenser is very concerned with appearances, and maintaining his office's aura of respectability.  Spenser has little use for Louie Ciccone, who he believes is certifiably crazy—and almost no tolerance for Redfern's continued association with him.
Frank Adamson as Sergeant John Brown, the Toronto homicide detective most often assigned to the cases Louis has an interest in.  He has a mostly antagonistic relationship with Louis, but will begrudgingly admit that Ciccone has given him some good information that has led to the right arrests.
John Fox as Officer Falstaff, Brown's clumsy-but-good-natured usual partner.

Seeing Things was a hit, and guest-starred several celebrities, such as Ronnie Hawkins, Bruno Gerussi, Gordon Pinsent and Karen Kain. Another notable appearance is by Mark McKinney of The Kids in the Hall, who played a character working in a morgue in the episode "Another Point of View".

Reception
The show won several awards. In 1983, Del Grande won an ACTRA Award for Best Actor in a Television Drama, and Sheldon Chad won an ACTRA award for Best Writer Television Drama for the episode "Seeing Double".

In Canada, it aired on CBC, typically drawing 1.1 million viewers. In the United States, it was broadcast by PBS.

At the time it first aired, it was the "most successful home-grown program in Canada".

Episodes

Series overview

Season 1 (1981)
Season 1 episodes aired on Tuesday nights at 9.

Season 2 (1982)
Season 2 moved to Wednesday nights at 9.

Season 3 (1984)
Season 3 episodes aired Sunday nights at 8.

Season 4 (1985)
Season 4 episodes aired Sunday nights at 8.

Season 5 (1986)
Season 5 episodes aired Sunday nights at 8.

Season 6 (1987)
The final season moves to Tuesday nights at 9.  The final episode, broadcast five weeks after the rest of the series, aired on a Friday.

References

Further reading

External links

Unofficial Seeing Things Home Page

1980s Canadian crime drama television series
CBC Television original programming
1980s Canadian comedy-drama television series
1981 Canadian television series debuts
1987 Canadian television series endings
Television shows set in Toronto
Gemini and Canadian Screen Award for Best Comedy Series winners
Television shows filmed in Toronto
Fantasy television series
Urban fantasy